Cauthen is a surname. Notable people with the surname include:

Paul Cauthen (born 1986), American singer-songwriter
Steve Cauthen (born 1960), American jockey
Terrance Cauthen (born 1976), American boxer
Wayne A. Cauthen (born 1955), American politician